The 2003–04 Slovak 1.Liga season was the 11th season of the Slovak 1. Liga, the second level of ice hockey in Slovakia. 11 teams participated in the league, and HK Spartak Dubnica won the championship.

Regular season

Playoffs

Quarterfinals 

 PHK Prešov – HC Dukla KAV Hurban Senica  3:1  (6:1, 4:2, 0:1, 4:3)
 Spartak Dubnica nad Váhom – HK VTJ Trebišov  3:0  (6:5, 4:3, 2:1)
 HC VTJ Telvis Topoľčany – HK Spišská Nová Ves  3:0  (4:0. 4:3PP, 4:1)
 MšHK Prievidza – HKm Detva (Zvolen B)  3:0  (6:1, 5:1, 4:3)

Semifinals 

 PHK Prešov – MšHK Prievidza  1:3  (2:3, 3:5, 8:1, 1:4)
 Spartak Dubnica nad Váhom – HC VTJ Telvis Topoľčany  3:0  (4:2, 5:1, 2:1)

3rd place 

 PHK Prešov – HC VTJ Telvis Topoľčany  2:0  (4:1, 8:7)

Finál 

 Spartak Dubnica nad Váhom – MšHK Prievidza  4:3  (1:2, 1:3, 4:2, 1:4, 5:2, 6:3, 5:2)

External links
 Season on hockeyarchives.info

Slovak 1. Liga
Slovak 1. Liga seasons
Liga